Harmer Glacier is a glacier  long, flowing southwest from Starbuck Peak to the sea close north of Ranvik, on the south coast of South Georgia. It was surveyed by the South Georgia Survey in the period 1951–57, and named by the UK Antarctic Place-Names Committee for Sir Sidney F. Harmer.

See also
 List of glaciers in the Antarctic
 Glaciology

References

Glaciers of South Georgia